Salad and Go is a drive-thru restaurant chain that specializes in salads, wraps, and breakfast. The brand is headquartered in Phoenix with a second office in Addison, Texas, and two food production facilities in Phoenix and Dallas. Salad and Go is a privately held company with more than 85 locations operating across four states including Arizona, Texas, Oklahoma and Nevada. 

The brand features a chef-curated menu with a variety of fresh and affordable items such as salads, wraps, soups, breakfast burritos and bowls, cold brew coffee and hand-crafted lemonades.

Company Mission
Salad and Go’s mission is “to make fresh nutritious food convenient and affordable for ALL.” As part of this mission, the brand puts a special emphasis on community outreach and philanthropic initiatives.

History 
Salad and Go was founded in 2013 in Gilbert, Arizona when the original co-founders discovered nationally-recognized Chef Daniel Patino at a local upscale restaurant and asked him to help them bring the concept to life. Patino accepted the offer and became co-founder and executive chef of Salad and Go. Chef Patino remains executive chef for the brand, and works to continuously develop new healthy, craveable recipes. 

In March 2022, industry veteran Charlie Morrison joined Salad and Go as Chief Executive Officer (CEO) to oversee strategy, operations, and development of the company with goals of turning the brand into an industry leader. Since Morrison joined, the brand has scaled quickly into major markets including the Dallas-Fort Worth Metroplex (DFW), Houston, Las Vegas and Oklahoma City while continuing to open locations in its home state of Arizona. Salad and Go is on track to have a total of 135 stores open by the end of 2023.

Operations 
Salad and Go ensures each meal has fresh, quality ingredients while maintaining low costs for guests by vertically integrating operations and distribution, sourcing ingredients directly from high-quality local farmers and suppliers whenever possible. The restaurant chain operates two food production facilities - one in Arizona and one in Texas - which prepare produce directly from farms and deliver it to stores, ensuring efficiency of distribution and quality of ingredients. The salad chain has plans to build a new food production facility in North Texas by 2025. 

The company’s focus on efficiency is apparent in its relationships with suppliers as well as the development and construction of each drive-thru location it adds to its network. The average Salad and Go store size is approximately 750 square feet. This smaller-model allows the stores to be built quickly in targeted areas while minimizing costs. 

Every Salad and Go store has a drive-thru lane and a pickup window for orders placed in the drive-thru, online or through the Salad and Go mobile app. Some of the locations feature a double-lane drive-thru, allowing for increased efficiency in serving guests.

Menu 
Salad and Go believes in using fresh, whole, natural ingredients. The brand firmly believes in healthy living through a balanced mix of fresh vegetables, proteins, grains, and healthy fats. 

Salad and Go is designed to serve as the perfect one-stop-shop for food at any time of day by providing a variety of healthy meals including salads, wraps, breakfast burritos and soup as well as refreshing beverages such as hand-crafted lemonades, teas and cold brew coffees. The chef-curated menu provides high-value, made-to-order options for guests with the quick and easy convenience of drive-thru service and affordability.

The Salad and Go menu currently offers eight salads with house-made dressings and a choice of proteins (chicken, steak and tofu). Additionally, every salad is available as a wrap. The menu also features select soup offerings and five breakfast burrito options, also available to order as bowls. The stores are open 6:30 a.m.- 9 p.m.Monday through Friday and 7 a.m.9 p.m. Saturday and Sunday. Breakfast is served from 6:30-10:30 a.m. Monday through Friday and 7-11 a.m. Saturday and Sunday.

Locations 
Salad and Go currently has more than 85 stores operating across four states: Arizona, Texas, Oklahoma and Nevada. Salad and Go was established in Arizona, where its first location opened in Gilbert in 2013. To see if Salad and Go is operating in a city near you, visit the Salad and Go website.

Community Impact 
Salad and Go demonstrates its mission “to make fresh, nutritious food convenient and affordable for ALL” in ways that extend beyond serving guests from its stores. In 2020, Salad and Go stepped in to serve the most vulnerable populations affected by the pandemic and inspired guests to give generously as well. Salad and Go’s community outreach initiatives evolved into what the brand refers to today as its Salad Donation and Guest Give Programs. Now, the brand raises funds and collaborates with its guests to support its local communities and organizations aligned with the company's mission. The Salad Donation and Guest Give Programs continue to grow with a strong focus on access for unhoused communities and those battling hunger by way of partnerships with local organizations and programs, weekly volunteer opportunities, and donations of salads prepared during new store team member training.

The Salad Donation Program is helping to combat hunger and food scarcity by providing fresh, nutritious and delicious meals to those in need. Everything packed and donated comes from team members, non profit teams, and volunteers who are trained to portion and build salads just as they are made in the stores. Donated food is monitored and checked for quality assurance to ensure food safety standards are being met and implemented. Salad and Go donates more than 3,400 salads per week to organizations serving people in need of food assistance. When a new store opens, Salad and Go donates around 1,000 salads made in the process of training new team members to nonprofits in the new store’s local community.  

In 2022, the brand also launched  its Healthy Habits program which teaches youth the importance of healthy eating and living. Healthy Habits classes provide information about nutrition and exercise and give the children participating opportunities to try healthy ingredients, sometimes for the very first time.

In 2022, Salad and Go partnered with four organizations for its Guest Give program: American Heart Association, American Diabetes Association, Back 2 School America, and American Cancer Society. Salad and Go teamed up with local chapters of the national organizations, ensuring that funds raised locally stayed local.

The Guest Give, Salad Donation and Healthy Habits programs are a testament to Salad and Go’s unwavering commitment to its communities and the support the brand has from its team members, volunteers and community. The outreach throughout 2022 had a tremendous impact on those in need and Salad and Go plans to continue making a positive change wherever it can for its communities.

Careers 
As the brand continues growing, so does the Salad and Go family. Salad and Go strives to provide  opportunities for growth to its team members while supporting them with the resources and opportunities they need to be successful. The brand celebrates a positive company culture and has hourly wages and salaried positions available. Those interested in learning more about Salad and Go career opportunities can visit the Salad and Go website.

See also
 List of salads
 List of fast food restaurant chains

References

External Links 

 Official website

American companies established in 2016
Regional restaurant chains in the United States
Restaurants established in 2016
Fast-food chains of the United States